Venizelos is a Greek surname. It may refer to:

 Eleftherios Venizelos (1864–1936), Greek politician
 Sofoklis Venizelos (1894–1964), Greek politician, son of the above
 Evangelos Venizelos (born 1957), Greek politician, unrelated to the above
 Andreas Venizelos, a fictional character in the Honorverse

See also
 Eleftherios Venizelos International Airport
 Eleftherios Venizelos, Crete

Greek-language surnames